A blood stripe is a scarlet stripe worn down the outside leg seams of trousers on the dress uniform of the United States Marine Corps. Modified versions are worn on the officers' evening dress uniforms, with the scarlet flanked with gold trim, and on members of the Marine Band, which wear the traditional red stripe with a white stripe in the center.

History 
While trouser stripes were in use in various militaries for many years (especially the British Army, whose uniforms influenced American uniforms for many years, as well as the red stripes of the Spanish Navy Marines). In 1837, President Andrew Jackson ordered uniform changes that included the Marine Corps adopt the Army's practice of wearing stripes the same color as uniform jacket facings. These original stripes were buff white to match changes to the uniform jacket, but when the jacket was changed back to dark blue with red trim in 1839, the stripes remained, but altered to a similar blue edged in red. A U.S. Naval Institute history of USMC uniforms records that orders issued in January 1840 provided that officers and non commissioned officers were to wear a scarlet stripe down the outside seam of their blue trousers.

An urban legend in the Marine Corps is that the blood stripe is to honor fallen marines from the Battle of Chapultepec in 1847, however, this is a myth, as the trouser stripe was previously adopted from the U.S. Army in 1837."

See also 
 Lampasse for military trouser-stripes in general.
 Leatherneck
 Eagle, Globe, and Anchor
 Uniforms of the United States Marine Corps

References

Sources 
 
 Dress Blues on marines.com
 Blood Stripe on Answers.com
 
 

United States Marine Corps lore and symbols
Trousers and shorts
United States military uniforms